"The Captain" is a country song performed and written by Kasey Chambers and produced by her brother, Nash Chambers. It was released in 2000 as the third and final single from her first studio album, The Captain (1999).

Reception
At the ARIA Music Awards of 2000, the song won Chambers an ARIA Award for Best Female Artist and was nominated for Single of the Year.
The song won the "Most Performed Country Work" and was nominated for "Song of the Year" at the APRA Music Awards of 2001.

Junkee said, "Those who find Kasey Chambers’ distinctive twang too much for their ears are depriving themselves of a true joy. Her timid, cracking vocal carries the gorgeous ‘The Captain’, as perfect a country-pop song as there ever was."

Track listing

Charts

References

1999 songs
2000 singles
ARIA Award-winning songs
EMI Records singles

Kasey Chambers songs
Songs written by Kasey Chambers